8:30 is the second live album of the jazz fusion group Weather Report, issued in 1979 by ARC/Columbia Records. The album rose to No. 3 on the Billboard Jazz Albums chart and No. 47 on the Billboard 200 chart. 8:30 also won a Grammy Award for Best Jazz Fusion Performance.

Recording 

The album takes its name from the band's habit of starting their performance at 8:30 PM. At the time of the tour, the band was a quartet and would take the stage continuously for around two and a half hours, each of the members taking a solo. Wayne Shorter sometimes plays percussion instead of saxophone on stage, and on one of the studio tracks, the calypso inspired "Brown Street", Joe Zawinul's son Erich plays percussion with Erskine and Pastorius.

Jaco Pastorius played a notable solo on "Slang" which started with an out-of-time rendition of "Dolores" by Wayne Shorter, then melded a multi-part bass solo using a rack-mounted MXR digital delay, leading into references to "Third Stone from the Sun" by Jimi Hendrix, "Portrait of Tracy" from his solo work, then "The Sound of Music". He finished playing his bass with its own strap.

According to Peter Erskine, the band had planned for the entire album to be live, but an engineer accidentally erased some of the material, prompting the band to go into the studio to record the fourth side.

Release 
The album was originally a double gatefold LP. In the US, the reissue on CD dropped "Scarlet Woman", as the album's running time narrowly exceeds the Red Book standard's maximum running time for a single CD. The album was released as a 2-CD set outside the US.

Critical reception 
Reviewing in Christgau's Record Guide: Rock Albums of the Seventies (1981), Robert Christgau wrote: "The live double their more bemused admirers have waited for years is indeed Weather Report's most (if not first) useful album. But it also defines their limits. This is a band that runs the gamut from the catchy to the mysterioso. Joe Zawinul is the best sound effects man since Shadow Morton. And when he gives himself room, Wayne Shorter can blow."

Track listing

Personnel
 Joe Zawinul – keyboards, ARP Quadra synthesizer bass, Korg Vocoder VC-10, Sequential Circuits Prophet-5, percussion
 Wayne Shorter – tenor saxophone, soprano saxophone
 Jaco Pastorius – fretless bass guitar, percussion; drums on "8:30" & "Brown Street"
 Peter Erskine – drums
 Erich Zawinul – percussion on "Brown Street"
 The West Los Angeles Christian Academy Children's Choir – vocals on "The Orphan"

References

External links 
 Weather Report - 8:30 (1979) album releases & credits at Discogs
 Weather Report - 8:30 (1979) album to be listened on Spotify
 Weather Report - 8:30 (1979) album to be listened on YouTube

Weather Report albums
1979 live albums
Live jazz fusion albums
Columbia Records live albums
 Columbia Records albums
ARC Records albums
Grammy Award for Best Jazz Fusion Performance